Hardy is an unincorporated community located in Grenada County, Mississippi and part of the Grenada Micropolitan Statistical Area .

The community was named for Richard Hardy, who owned the land on which the railroad depot was built.

Hardy is located on the former Illinois Central Railroad.

A post office operated under the name Hardy from 1868 to 1966.

References

Unincorporated communities in Mississippi
Unincorporated communities in Grenada County, Mississippi